Hypericum rumeliacum is a species of flowering plant in the family Hypericaceae, native to southeastern Europe.

References

 Robson, N. K. B., "Studies in the genus Hypericum L. (Guttiferae). 1. Infrageneric classification", Bull. Br. Mus. (Nat. Hist.), Bot. 5:325. 1977.

External links

rumeliacum
Flora of Southeastern Europe
Taxa named by Pierre Edmond Boissier